Don Bradman Cricket 14 (re-release retitled Don Bradman Cricket) is a cricket video game for the PlayStation 3, Xbox 360, Microsoft Windows, PlayStation 4 and Xbox One. It was developed by Big Ant Studios and published by Tru Blu Entertainment. The game was originally released for PlayStation 3 and Xbox 360 consoles in various countries that compete in cricket in April 2014; it was released for PlayStation 4 and Xbox One on 11 February 2015. Its sequel Don Bradman Cricket 17 was released on 16 December 2016.

Features
The game features a number of different game modes, including a career mode, custom matches and online games. The career mode involves a user creating a player who starts off at 16 years old and plays for a career of up to 20 years. There is also a Cricket Academy program in which a user can create and edit teams, players and competitions. This was released as a stand-alone game before the console release date.

The game contains the original cricket stats of every player and they can be modified too. Each cricketer face is created in a realistic way to experience a new feel. Big Ant Studios updated the academy and brought the 'Practice Nets' feature into it in the weeks prior to the launch of the full game. The gameplay features were announced as having "Unique Batting and Bowling Controls" with a full 360 shot delivery with no shot markers. The gameplay also involves a "Fully featured Fielding System" which allows "full control of the field". The Ball Physics in the game has been labelled as having "realistic edges and ball movement off players". Appeal and Electric Reviews have also been included into the game, which enables a user to challenge the umpire for a decision in which is questionable. There are Practice nets and Match practice which are new features to the game and are supposed to help a new 'cricketing gamer' to play the game. Users can also save games online and offline. The commentary team consists of Matthew Hill and David Basheer.

There are 11 unlicensed grounds within the game, with 2 licensed. The game includes 79 teams within the game, most of which are unlicensed. There are international and domestic teams (current generation) historical teams and future generation teams. There are 17 international teams, 6 Australian domestic teams, 18 English domestic, along with "All time best" teams and "historical" teams.

Development
According to Ross Symons, CEO of Big Ant Studios, development of the game was hindered by the parallel development of Ashes Cricket 2013, an officially licensed rival cricket game. Symons claims that the developers of Ashes Cricket 2013 applied pressure via the Australian Cricket Board to warn various partners off his game, while the eventual poor reception to Ashes Cricket 2013 forced him to delay Don Bradman Cricket 14 as not to be caught up in the controversy.

The game was built using a Big Ant Studios-built game engine written in Assembly language and C++.

Soundtrack

Reception

Don Bradman Cricket 14 has received positive reviews from critics. Tristan Ogilvie of IGN rated the console version 6.8/10, praising the "comprehensive control setup" and "License-dodging player creation", but also criticized the high amount of bugs, lack of field radars and unrealistic super-fielders. However, the PC version was rated 8/10 by IGN, who later believed that the fixes made it in the interim turned it into "easily the finest and fully-featured cricket game ever made". Dene Benham of NZGamer gave the game 7.9/10, praising the batting and bowling aspects, but criticized the clunky menus and twitchy animations. Critical Hit awarded it 8.7 citing it as "the best cricket game of last generation".

Sequel

Big Ant Studios have announced on the planetcricket forum that they are currently working on a sequel titled " Don Bradman Cricket 17". They have taken voice commentary samples from the fans to add diversity to the game.

On 28 May 2016, BigAnt Studios officially announced Don Bradman Cricket 17 for PS4, Xbox One and PC,  which was released in late December 2016. Academy Demo was made available on Steam.

References

2014 video games
Cricket video games
Video games based on real people
Cultural depictions of Don Bradman
PlayStation 3 games
PlayStation 4 games
Multiplayer and single-player video games
Video games developed in Australia
Video games set in Australia
Video games set in the United Kingdom
Video games set in India
Windows games
Xbox 360 games
Xbox One games
Big Ant Studios games
Tru Blu Entertainment games